N. californica  may refer to:
 Notholaena californica, the California cloak fern, a plant species native to southern California, Arizona, and adjacent northwestern Mexico
 Nymphalis californica, the California tortoiseshell, a butterfly species

See also
 List of Latin and Greek words commonly used in systematic names#C